Winman is an English surname. Notable people with the surname include:

 Richard Wenman ( 1712–1781), Canadian merchant and politician
 Sarah Winman (born 1964), British actor and author

See also
 Wineman

English-language surnames